The Malaysia Men's National Wheelchair Basketball Team is the wheelchair basketball side that represents Malaysia in international competitions for men as part of the International Wheelchair Basketball Federation.

Competitions
The Malaysia men's team has not competed at the Wheelchair Basketball World Championship or at the Summer Paralympics.  They are competing in the 2013 Asia Oceania Zone Championship.

References

National men's wheelchair basketball teams
Wheelchair basketball